The Lowry Bombing and Gunnery Range (LBGR) was a World War II and Cold War facility that included 4 of the 6 HGM-25A Titan I missile launch complexes southeast of Denver, Colorado.

Army Air Force range
The area of the Lowry range was initially part of the 1937 Buckley Field's  that became an Army Airfield in 1942. In World War II, bombing with "practice and HE bombs", training in "fixed and flexible gunnery", and rifle training were conducted at the range. The 1st of the Army Air Forces Bombardier Schools was at Lowry from July 1940 through March 14, 1941, used the Buckley range and graduated 3 instructor classes of graduates who opened the bombardier school at Barksdale Field.
Camp Bizerte  Camp Bizerte at the range was a World War II training facility for simulating an overseas Army field camp.  Part of the 12-week AAF Photography Course at Lowry Field in 1943 was conducted at Camp Bizerte.

Lowry Bombing and Gunnery Range was designated after the "Tech-Division Air Training Command" on September 20, 1946, transferred  to the custody of Lowry Field, and the 9800th Technical Service Unit cleared the 1st site at LBGR--—of munitions, and the site was certified along with the "BT1" site as clear on November 16, 1948. Post-war the west end of LBGR was used as an explosives demolition site.

The "Air-to-Ground Bombing and Gunnery Mission" at LBGR terminated in 1956, and RBS by the redesignated (1955) Detachment 1, 11th RBS Sq, continued until it moved to the former La Junta Army Airfield (La Junta Bomb Plot, 1959-1990). In 1963, a portion of LBGR (Lowry Missile Site No. 1) had been "cleared of surface MEC"—munitions and explosives of concern). From 1960 and 1980, ~ of the LBGR were transferred to various other state and federal agencies and private owners.

Missile complexes

Lowry Missile Site No. 1 ("Lowry Air Force Missile Site" before being renamed in 1960) of  included a large portion of the LBGR and began in September 1958 with the start of construction prior to excavation for the eventual 4 complexes (1 off of LBGR,--additional Site No. 2 also had a complex on the former range). Construction on the 1st operational complex, Titan I Missile Complex 1A, began in April 1959, mining excavation of 1/2 million cubic yards of rock was completed by 4 June 1961, and the site was finished in December 1961 (the dedication was on April 18, 1962). Missiles were assembled at the Glenn L. Martin plant southwest of Denver (the co-located test site with 4 stands had been transferred to the Air Force), and Lowry AFB's 724th Strategic Missile Squadron (April 26, 1961 – June 25, 1965) commanded the Site No. 1 complexes. Site No. 1 was adjacent to the Lowry Landfill on the west and Complex 1A was privatized on January 31, 1969.

In January 1964 the Secretary of Defense informed congress the Titan 1 bases would be closed in 1965, and the last Lowry missile was taken off alert status March 26, 1965 (all Titan 1s were in storage by April 18). (Titan 1s were stored at Mira Loma Air Force Station, California, until being scrapped in Spring 1966.) Titan I Missile Complex 2A on the former LBGR was transferred to the Department of the Army on October 12, 1977.

Denver area complexes 

A total of six missile complex sites operated in the Denver area from 1960 – 1965.
On the Lowry Bombing and Gunnery Range
 724-A, SW of Watkins, Colorado 
 724-B, SSW of Watkins, Colorado 
 724-C, S of Bennett, Colorado  
 725-A, 14 miles SE of Watkins, Colorado 
Outside the LBGR
 725-B, 4 miles NNE of Deer Trail, Colorado 
 725-C, 5 miles SSE of Elisabeth, Colorado

Lowry Training Annex
In 1969, Lowry Training Annex adjacent to the former LBGR area was established after the Department of the Navy transferred ~ to the U.S. Air Force (the Navy had nearby land as early as July 30, 1948, and used the bombing range in 1952 for training).

Bennett Army National Guard facility
In 2006 the Bennett facility was excessed by the government and was the "last federal property transferred" of the former Lowry Bombing and Gunnery Range.

In 2012, oil was struck on the Former Lowry Bombing and Gunnery Range.

References

Bombing ranges
Cold War military installations of the United States
Colorado National Guard
Closed installations of the United States Army
Military history of Colorado